Källa Frida Bie (born 20 July 1974 in Ytterhogdal, Hälsingland, Sweden) is a Swedish actress.  After her role in Festival (2001), she trained as a midwife and decreased the frequency of her acting appearances.

Filmography
 Arne Dahl: Bad Blood (2012; TV movie) 
 Stormen (2009; TV series)
 En spricka i kristallen (2007)
 Beck – Skarpt läge (2006)
 Festival (2001)
 c/o Segemyhr (1999)
 Vuxna människor (1999)

References

External links
 

1974 births
Swedish film actresses
Living people
Swedish television actresses